The 2015 UEFA Europa League Final was the final match of the 2014–15 UEFA Europa League, the 44th season of Europe's secondary club football tournament organised by UEFA, and the sixth season since it was renamed from the UEFA Cup to the UEFA Europa League. It was played at the National Stadium in Warsaw, Poland, on 27 May 2015, between Ukrainian side Dnipro Dnipropetrovsk and the title holders, Spanish side Sevilla. Sevilla won the match 3–2 for a record fourth title.

As winners, Sevilla earned the right to play against the winners of the 2014–15 UEFA Champions League, Barcelona, in the 2015 UEFA Super Cup. Moreover, for the first time, a place in the UEFA Champions League was reserved for the UEFA Europa League winners, meaning that Sevilla automatically qualified for the 2015–16 UEFA Champions League despite not qualifying through their domestic league position. They were guaranteed to enter at the group stage, since the 2015 Champions League finalists (Juventus and Barcelona) have already qualified for the group stage via their domestic leagues and therefore the berth in the group stage reserved for the Champions League title holders are not used.

Venue

The National Stadium was announced as the venue of the final at the UEFA Executive Committee meeting on 23 May 2013. This was the first UEFA club final hosted in Poland.

The National Stadium is a retractable roof football stadium located in Warsaw, Poland. It is used mostly for football matches and it is the home stadium of Poland national football team. The stadium has a seating capacity of 58,145 which makes it the largest association football arena in Poland. Its construction started in 2008 and finished in November 2011. It is located on the site of the former Stadion Dziesięciolecia, on Aleja Zieleniecka in Praga Południe district, near the city centre. It hosted three group matches (including the opening match), a quarter-final, and a semi-final in UEFA Euro 2012, co-hosted by Poland and Ukraine.

Background
This was Dnipro Dnipropetrovsk's first European final. They were the second Ukrainian team to reach the UEFA Cup/Europa League final, after Shakhtar Donetsk, who defeated Werder Bremen in the 2009 final in Istanbul, and the third Ukrainian team to play a European final, after Shakhtar Donetsk and Dynamo Kyiv, who won two Cup Winners' Cup finals in 1975 and 1986 as representatives of the Soviet Union. Before this final, Ukrainian clubs had won every major European final which they had competed.

This was Sevilla's fourth UEFA Cup/Europa League final. They won all three of their previous finals (in 2006, 2007 and 2014). As they won their fourth title, they became the outright record holder, breaking a tie with Juventus, Inter Milan and Liverpool. Their manager Unai Emery, who was also the winning manager in 2014, became the fifth coach to win the title twice or more, after Giovanni Trapattoni (Juventus in 1977 and 1993, Inter Milan in 1991), Luis Molowny (Real Madrid in 1985 and 1986), Juande Ramos (Sevilla in 2006 and 2007) and Rafael Benítez (Valencia in 2004, Chelsea in 2013).

The two sides had never met in UEFA club competitions.

Road to the final

Note: In the table, the score of the finalist is given first (H = home; A = away).

Dnipro Dnipropetrovsk
As runners-up of the 2013–14 Ukrainian Premier League behind Shakhtar, Dnipro were awarded a spot in the third qualifying round of the 2014–15 UEFA Champions League for the first time in their history. They were drawn against Danish runners-up FC Copenhagen, but a draw in the first leg at home, followed by a 2–0 defeat in Denmark, meant they dropped down into the Europa League play-off, where they defeated Hajduk Split to reach the group stage for the third time in a row.

Dnipro were drawn in Group F with Inter Milan, Saint-Étienne, and Qarabağ. The group stage campaign started disastrously for the Ukrainians, who earned only a single point in their first three games with a 0–0 draw away to Saint-Étienne and 1–0 home defeats to both Inter and Qarabağ. On matchday 4, a 2–1 away win over the Azerbaijani team ended a winless run, but Dnipro were again defeated by Inter 2–1 in Milan, despite taking a 1–0 lead through Ruslan Rotan's early goal. Dnipro went into their final group match at home to Saint-Étienne at the bottom of the Group F table and needing a win to stand a chance of qualifying; Artem Fedetskyi scored the only goal of the match midway through the second half to secure a 1–0 win. With Qarabağ only managing a 0–0 draw against group winners Inter, Dnipro finished the group stage in second place with seven points.

Sevilla
As title holders, Sevilla qualified for the group stage automatically, and were placed in Group G with Feyenoord, Rijeka and Standard Liège. They began their campaign with a 2–0 win over Feyenoord, with first-half goals from Grzegorz Krychowiak and Stéphane Mbia. Two weeks later, Mbia earned a 2–2 draw at Rijeka. Sevilla then played Liège twice, a goalless away draw and a 3–1 home victory with goals from Kevin Gameiro, José Antonio Reyes and Carlos Bacca. They then lost 2–0 away to Feyenoord, sending the Dutch side to the knockout stage ahead of Sevilla. The Spanish side secured second place in the final game with a home victory over Rijeka via Denis Suárez's first European goal.

Pre-match

Ambassador

Former Poland international goalkeeper Jerzy Dudek, who won the Champions League with Liverpool in 2005, was named the ambassador for the final.

Officials
In May 2015, English referee Martin Atkinson was chosen to oversee the final.  He was joined by compatriots Stephen Child and Michael Mullarkey as assistant referees, Andre Marriner and Anthony Taylor as additional assistant referees, Jake Collin as reserve assistant referee, and the Czech Pavel Královec as fourth official.

Logo
UEFA unveiled the visual identity of the final on 29 August 2014.

Ticketing
With a stadium capacity of 56,000, a total of 44,000 tickets were made available to fans and the general public, with the two finalist teams receiving 9,500 tickets each and 25,000 tickets sold to fans worldwide via the UEFA website from 26 February to 25 March 2015 in four price categories: €130, €90, €65, and €40.

Match

Kits
At the behest of club president José Castro, Sevilla chose to wear their red away kit, featuring their badge rather than the "SFC" monogram which they had previously been sporting.

Summary

Although Sevilla dominated possession in the early exchanges, Dnipro opened the scoring after seven minutes when Nikola Kalinić headed in a cross from Matheus. In the 28th minute, Dnipro failed to clear from a free kick and Sevilla midfielder Grzegorz Krychowiak took possession of the ball, taking a step to evade Léo Matos before shooting an equaliser in his home country. Only three minutes later, the Spanish club took the lead, when captain José Antonio Reyes, in what was reported to be his final match for Sevilla, found Carlos Bacca who rounded Dnipro goalkeeper Denys Boyko. Only two minutes before half time, Dnipro equalised, with Ruslan Rotan dispatching a free kick past Sergio Rico.

In the 58th minute, Sevilla made the game's first substitution: Reyes made way for Coke, who went into his habitual right-back position, pushing Aleix Vidal forward into the right-wing position held by Reyes. Fifteen minutes later, Sevilla scored the winner, Bacca converting after being supplied by Vitolo. Soon after, Dnipro made an attacking change, replacing Kalinić with Yevhen Seleznyov, and Sevilla substituted Bacca for Kevin Gameiro. The two teams then made their last substitutions in the closing stages, Dnipro replaced Jaba Kankava with Yevhen Shakhov and Sevilla took off Éver Banega for Vicente Iborra.

Soon after all changes had been made, Dnipro's Matheus collapsed and was taken off by medical staff. Manager Myron Markevych confirmed that he was treated at hospital for a nasal fracture and a head injury, being discharged in good health hours later to reunite with his teammates.

Sevilla's record fourth title meant that Spain and Italy were tied with the most UEFA Cup/Europa League titles, with both countries having won nine times. José Antonio Reyes became the first player to win the UEFA Cup/Europa League four times, as he was also a member of the winning side for Atlético Madrid in 2010 and 2012 (although he missed the latter final) and for Sevilla in 2014. Three players had won the title three times: Ray Clemence, Giuseppe Bergomi, and Nicola Berti.

Details

Statistics

See also
2015 UEFA Champions League Final
Sevilla FC in European football

References

External links

2014–15 UEFA Europa League
2015 final: Warsaw

2015
Final
2014–15 in Polish football
Sports competitions in Warsaw
International club association football competitions hosted by Poland
2014–15 in Ukrainian football
2014–15 in Spanish football
FC Dnipro matches
Sevilla FC matches
May 2015 sports events in Europe
2010s in Warsaw